Delta Tankers is a Greek shipping company, highly active in the suezmax and VLCC sectors.

Controversies 

Delta Tankers ltd is the manager of the crude oil tanker Bouboulina (IMO 9298753), the ship that Brazilian investigators said was the source of oil tarring thousands of kilometers of coastline since August 2019. Delta Tankers Ltd said on Friday that it has not been contacted by Brazilian authorities investigating an oil spill incident in Brazil. The Brazilian oil spill prompted the company in November to offer to share the ship's data with the Brazilian invesitigators.

See also 
 Greek Merchant Marine
 MARPOL 73/78

References

External links 

 Official website

Shipping companies of Greece
Oil tankers